This is a list of settlements in Greater Manchester by population based on the results of the 2011 census. The next United Kingdom census will take place in 2021. In 2011, there were 61 built-up area subdivisions with 5,000 or more inhabitants in Greater Manchester, shown in the table below.

Administrative boundaries 

Table taken from the Greater Manchester article:

Population ranking 

Notes:
 ‡ Prestwich (Bury) included in count.
 † Shevington Vale merges into Appley Bridge which is in Lancashire, their population has been added to the ONS statistics.

See also 
 Greater Manchester
 Greater Manchester Built-up Area

References

External links
 Link to ONS built up area statistics

Settlements
 
Metropolitan areas of England
 
Greater Manchester